The MV Ben Bates was a coastal tanker built for the National Benzole Company by Rowhedge Ironworks in 1956. She was sold to Shell-Mex and BP in 1959. In 1972 she was again sold, to Woodwards Oil, and renamed MV Tana Woodward. Her final sale was to Coastal Shipping in 1976. She was scrapped in 1987.

References

External links 

Oil tankers
1956 ships